Donald Frank Mazankowski  (July 27, 1935 – October 27, 2020) was a Canadian politician who served as a cabinet minister under prime ministers Joe Clark and Brian Mulroney, including as deputy prime minister under Mulroney.

After retiring from politics in 1993, Mazankowski was a consultant with the law firm of Gowling Lafleur Henderson LLP. He also served as a director or trustee for several companies, including Weyerhaeuser Co., ATCO Ltd., Shaw Communications Inc., and Power Corporation of Canada.

Early life
Mazankowski was born in Viking, Alberta, on July 27, 1935. His parents, Frank and Dora (Lonowski), were of Polish descent and came to Canada from the United States in 1921. Mazankowski moved to Chicago after completing high school and was employed as a dispatcher in a trucking business. He later returned to Alberta and started his own gas station in Innisfree. Together with his brother Ray, he opened a car dealership on the outskirts of Vegreville.

Mazankowski's first taste of politics came during his five-year tenure as a trustee of a local separate school. This inspired him to seek the Progressive Conservative Party nomination in his local riding of Vegreville, which he won in 1968.  During the federal election that same year, he was elected to the House of Commons of Canada as the Member of Parliament (MP) for Vegreville.

Political career
During the short-lived Clark government, Mazankowski served as Minister of Transport. When the Tories returned to power under Mulroney in the 1984 election, Mazankowski again became Minister of Transport.  In 1986, he was promoted to Deputy Prime Minister and Government House Leader. Mazankowski became one of the most widely known public faces of the Tory government. He played an especially important role as an advocate for the Canada–United States Free Trade Agreement and the North American Free Trade Agreement.

A bill to restore the death penalty was defeated by the House of Commons on June 30, 1987, in a 148–127 vote.  While Prime Minister Brian Mulroney, Minister of Justice Ray Hnatyshyn, and Minister of External Affairs Joe Clark opposed the bill, Mazankowski and a majority of Progressive Conservative MPs supported it. He became Finance Minister during a cabinet reshuffle in April 1991, replacing Michael Wilson.

After politics
Mazankowski retired from politics on June 7, 1993. When Kim Campbell succeeded Mulroney as PC leader and prime minister two weeks later, Mazankowski was replaced as Finance Minister by Gilles Loiselle. Mazankowski did not run in the 1993 election that saw his party reduced to two seats in the House of Commons. He returned to the private sector and served on the boards of several organizations, including the University of Alberta. Mazankowski declined an offer of a Senate seat made by Mulroney in his final days as prime minister.

In August 2001, Ralph Klein, the Premier of Alberta at the time, established the Premier's Advisory Council on Health, with Mazankowski as chair. He put the Council of twelve men in charge of reviewing Alberta's health care system and offering recommendations for health reform. The Council released its report on January 8, 2002, and the Alberta government accepted all of the recommendations. The report focused on market-consumerism with emphasis on consumer choice and market competition.

Mazankowski played an important role in the merger of the Progressive Conservative Party and the Canadian Alliance in 2003, and he was a strong supporter of the new Conservative Party of Canada. Mazankowski died on October 27, 2020, at the age of 85.

Honours
In 1992, Mazankowski was one of a small group of prominent Canadians who were given the honorific style of "Right Honourable" without having held any of the offices that would entitle them to it automatically.

In 2000, Mazankowski was made an Officer of the Order of Canada, and he was promoted to Companion in 2013. He was inducted to the Alberta Order of Excellence in 2003.

Archives 
There is a Donald Mazankowski fonds at Library and Archives Canada.

References

External links 

1935 births
2020 deaths
Canadian Ministers of Finance
Canadian Ministers of Transport
Deputy Prime Ministers of Canada
Directors of Power Corporation of Canada
Members of the 21st Canadian Ministry
Members of the 24th Canadian Ministry
Members of the Alberta Order of Excellence
Members of the House of Commons of Canada from Alberta
Members of the King's Privy Council for Canada
Companions of the Order of Canada
Canadian people of Polish descent
People from Beaver County, Alberta
Progressive Conservative Party of Canada MPs
Weyerhaeuser